The Change-Up is a 2011 American fantasy romantic comedy film produced and directed by David Dobkin and written by Jon Lucas and Scott Moore. The film stars Ryan Reynolds and Jason Bateman as Mitch Planko and Dave Lockwood, two best friends living in Atlanta who switch bodies after urinating into the fountain to wish they had each other's lives. The film was released on August 5, 2011, in North America, by Universal Pictures. It received negative reviews from critics.

Plot
In Atlanta, Dave Lockwood is married with three children, while his best friend Mitch Planko is single and at his sexual prime. After getting drunk at a bar, Mitch and Dave urinate into a fountain, simultaneously wishing they had each other's lives.

The next morning, Mitch and Dave realize they have switched bodies. Returning to the park to wish for their lives back, the fountain has been removed for restoration. Forced to wait until the parks department locates the fountain, Mitch and Dave have to pose as each other.

At Dave's law office, Mitch befriends Dave's assistant Sabrina, but his lack of professionalism and legal knowledge sabotage an important merger with a Japanese firm. Dave arrives at Mitch's film shoot, discovering it is a "lorno" – "light" pornography.

Dave takes Mitch to tell his wife Jamie the truth, but she does not believe him. Dave advises him on how to behave professionally, and Mitch sets up Dave on a date with Sabrina, as Mitch has a crush.

After speaking with his father, Mitch rededicates himself to Dave's life. At her ballet recital, Dave's eldest child Cara takes Mitch's advice and throws her bully to the floor, to which Mitch foul-mouthedly cheers. Cara tells him she loves him and he says the same, but feels guilty.

Dave takes the day off to take full advantage of being Mitch, who coaches him how to act like Mitch on the date, and shaves off Dave's pubic hair. Sabrina meets Dave at a classy restaurant and, despite only going because Mitch told her to, genuinely likes him, and they get tattoos. Dave walks her home, and she tells him to call her.

Mitch learns Dave told Jamie not to invite Mitch to their anniversary party, afraid he would ruin it. Dave informs Mitch the fountain has been found, but they both want to stay each other a bit longer. Mitch, forgets about the "Dialogue Night" he planned with Jamie, accidentally standing her up.

At the new merger meeting, the Japanese representatives offer only $625 million, $75 million short. As Dave's firm is about to agree, Mitch observes that the other representatives have not yet left, and compares the negotiations to sex and porn. He demands $725 million and has the representatives of Dave's firm begin to leave, scaring the other firm into agreement. Mitch and Dave's family go to a gala held by the firm in honor of Dave being made partner, but Jamie is upset by the speech that praises his family values.

Dave and Sabrina are at a baseball game when a thunderstorm hits, and wait it out at Mitch's house. She tells him she is going to have sex with him, but when he sees her tattoo of a many-spotted skipperling – his daughter's favorite butterfly – his focus returns to his family and he is determined to leave.

At the gala, Dave's boss delivers a speech about his accomplishments and love for his family, filling Mitch with guilt. Dave rushes in and kisses Jamie, finally convincing her that he is her husband. He and Mitch find the fountain surrounded by people. Proceeding with their plan to urinate in the fountain, Mitch is too embarrassed, especially after the crowd notices Dave doing so. Mitch asks why Dave did not invite him to his anniversary party, and Dave admits he was embarrassed by Mitch, but has grown to respect him while in his body. This relaxes Mitch enough to urinate, but their wish does not work. Security approaches, but on Mitch and Dave's third try the Galleria's lights go out, and they run.

In an epilogue, Dave and Mitch are thrilled to have returned to their original bodies. Mitch gets breakfast with Sabrina, not realizing the tattoo Dave got is of his face on Mitch's back, captioned "I ♥ Dave". Mitch speaks at his father's wedding, and attends Dave's anniversary party. In a post-credits scene, Dave and Jamie get high and visit the aquarium, while Mitch and Sabrina have sex for the first time, and Mitch sends Dave the porno he starred in.

Cast

In addition, Sydney Rouviere and Lauren and Luke Bain portray Dave and Jamie's three children, Cara, Sarah, and Peter, respectively.

Production
The film was shot in Atlanta, Georgia from October 2010 to January 2011, which is also its setting. There were open castings at Turner Field and other venues in Atlanta. Several of the bar scenes were shot on location at a bar called Joe's on Juniper, in midtown Atlanta. The exterior and interior scenes of the Lockwood home were shot on location at a Buckhead residence designed by Atlanta residential designer Steve McClanahan. The movie was also shot in Los Angeles. The house used for the Lockwood home is on the 2400 block of Gramercy Park in historic West Adams. Despite being set in the summertime, production continued during a major winter storm that briefly crippled the city in January, leaving Peachtree and other streets covered in snow and ice and nearly preventing the governor's inauguration. Reynolds complimented the city in his interview on The Tonight Show with Jay Leno, but joked that he thought the city "was trying to kill" him because of several unrelated incidents on the set and in his personal life that happened to occur during production. During her interview on Jimmy Kimmel Live!, Olivia Wilde stated that she refused to appear naked or take most of her clothes off and used a body double for some shots and wore pasties for close-up and upper shots. Leslie Mann has also followed this technique while other actresses used prosthetics.

Reception

The site's critical consensus reads, "There's a certain amount of fun to be had from watching Bateman and Reynolds play against type, but it isn't enough to carry The Change-Up through its crude humor and formulaic plot." On Metacritic, the film has a score of 39 out of 100 based on 35 critics, indicating "generally unfavorable reviews". Audiences polled by CinemaScore gave the film an average grade of "B" on an A+ to F scale.

British newspaper The Telegraph named The Change-Up one of the ten worst films of 2011, saying "Ryan Reynolds and Jason Bateman have skill, charm, timing – everything but the right script."

On its opening weekend, The Change-Up opened at #4, grossing $13,531,115 in 2,913 theaters with a $4,645 average. The film grossed $37.1 million in North America and $38.4 million in other territories for a worldwide total of $75.5 million against a budget of $52 million.

See also
 The Hot Chick (2002)
 Trading Places (1983)
 Multiplicity (1996)
 Freaky Friday (2003)
 Switched (2020)
 Freaky (2020)

References

External links
 
 
 
 
 
 

2011 films
2010s fantasy comedy films
2010s screwball comedy films
American fantasy comedy films
American screwball comedy films
American black comedy films
Films about wish fulfillment
Films set in Atlanta
Films set in Georgia (U.S. state)
Films shot in Georgia (U.S. state)
Body swapping in films
Original Film films
Relativity Media films
Universal Pictures films
Films directed by David Dobkin
Films produced by Neal H. Moritz
Films scored by John Debney
Films scored by Theodore Shapiro
Films with screenplays by Jon Lucas and Scott Moore
2011 comedy films
2010s English-language films
2010s American films